Gounghin is the name of several settlements in Burkina Faso. It may refer to:
 Gounghin, Gounghin, the capital of Gounghin Department, Kouritenga Province
 Gounghin, a district of Ouagadougou, the capital of Burkina Faso
 Gounghin, Ganzourgou, a village in Boudry Department, Ganzourgou Province
 Gounghin-Grand, a village in Bissiga Department, Boulgou Province
 Gounghin-Petit, a village in Bissiga Department, Boulgou Province